Black card may refer to:

Black card, a penalty card issued by an official in several sports for infractions
Black Card LLC, a credit card company now known as Luxury Card
Centurion Card, a black-colored American Express charge card

See also
Blue Card (disambiguation)
Carte blanche (disambiguation)
 Clubs (suit)
Gold card (disambiguation)
Green card (disambiguation)
Palladium Card, now known as the J.P. Morgan Reserve Card
Red card (disambiguation)
 Spades (suit)
White card (taxi)
White Card